Robin Gardner may refer to:

Robin Gardner (cricketer) (born 1934), English cricketer

See also
Robin Gartner, ice hockey player